Phlaocyon (from Greek phlao, "eat greedily" and cyon, "dog") is an extinct genus of the Borophaginae subfamily of canids native to North America. It is closely related to Cynarctoides.

Phylogeny
When discovered in the 19th century and during the following decades, Phlaocyon was thought to be ancestral to raccoons because of shared convergent adaptations toward hypocarnivorous dentitions, but  was the first to discover the canid nature of the middle ear region in P. leucosteus and Phlaocyon in now believed to be part of very diverse clade of hypocarnivorous canids, the Phlaocyonini, and only distantly related to raccoons.

P. mariae and P. yatkolai, both known from isolated teeth and fragmentary material, are the largest and most derived species, and both display a tendency away from the hypocarnivorous dentition of the genus and towards a more hypercarnivorous dentition.

Anatomy
Phlaocyon probably lived like a raccoon, often climbing trees. Its head was short, wide, and had forward-facing eyes. Unlike modern canides, Phlaocyon had no specialised teeth for slicing flesh. It is thought to have been an omnivore.

Species
 †P. achoros 
 †P. annectens 
 †P. latidens 
 †P. leucosteus 
 †P. mariae 
 †P. marslandensis 
 †P. minor 
 †P. multicuspus 
 †P. taylori 
 †P. yatkolai

Fossil distribution
Foree Site, John Day Formation, Wheeler County, Oregon (P. latidens) ~30.8–20.6 Ma.
Brooksville 2 Site, Hernando County, Florida (P. taylori) ~30.8–20.6 Ma.
SB-1A Live Oak Site, Suwannee County, Florida (P. leucosteus) ~24.8–20.6 Ma.
Buda Mine, Alachua County, Florida (P. indent) ~24.8–20.6 Ma.
Wewela Site, Tripp County, South Dakota (P. minor) ~26.3–24.8 Ma.

References

Notes

Sources

 
 
 
 
 
 
 
 
 
 
 
  (with illustrations by Mauricio Antón)
 

Borophagines
Oligocene canids
Miocene canids
Burdigalian genus extinctions
Cenozoic mammals of North America
Prehistoric carnivoran genera
Rupelian genus first appearances
Fossil taxa described in 1899